The Manubaran languages are a small family of Trans–New Guinea languages spoken around Mount Brown in the "Bird's Tail" (southeastern peninsula) of New Guinea. They are classified within the Southeast Papuan branch of Trans–New Guinea.

Languages
The languages are Doromu and Maria, and are 63% lexically similar.

Proto-language

Phonemes
Usher (2020) reconstructs the consonant inventory as follows:

{| 
| *m || *n ||  ||  || 
|-
| *p || *t ||  || *k || *ʔ
|-
| *b || *d ||  || *g || 
|-
|  || *s ||  ||  || [*h]
|-
| *w || *ɾ || *j ||  || 
|}
Vowels are *a *e *i *o *u.

Pronouns
Usher (2020) reconstructs the pronouns as:
{| 
! !!sg!!pl
|-
!1
|*na ||*[o/u]na
|-
!2
|colspan=2|*ja
|-
!3
|colspan=2|*ina
|}

Basic vocabulary

Usher (2020)
Some lexical reconstructions of Proto-Mount Brown and Proto-Doromu-Koki, as well as Proto-Gebi and Proto-Maria, by Usher (2020) are:

{| class="wikitable sortable"
! gloss !! Proto-Mount Brown !! Proto-Doromu-Koki !! Proto-Gebi !! Proto-Maria
|-
! head
| *ada || *ada || ada || *ada
|-
! hair/feather(s)
| *u[w]e[t/k]a || *u[w]eta || uweta || *u[w]eʔa
|-
! ear
| *anema || *anema || anema || *anema
|-
! eye
| *ne || *ne || ne-una || ne[ʔ]una
|-
! nose
| *uɾuma || *uɾuma || uruma || *uɾuma
|-
! tooth
| *gade || *gade || gadi || *gade
|-
! tongue
| *api[j]e || *aɸi[j]e || api || *aɸi[j]e
|-
! blood
| *daweʔa || *dawaʔa || dawa || *daweʔa
|-
! bone
| *nena || *nena || nena || *nena
|-
! skin/bark
| *ɾoʔo || *ɾoʔo || lo-o || *ɾoʔo
|-
! breast
| *sisu || *sisu || sisu || *hihu
|-
! louse
| *gu[w]e || *gu[w]e || gu-e || *gu[w]e
|-
! dog
| *auna || *auna || auna || *auna
|-
! pig
| *dona || *dona || dona || *dona
|-
! bird
| *eɾena || *eɾena || eerma || *eɾena
|-
! egg
| *unema || *unema || unema || *unema
|-
! tree
| *jabo || *jabo || iabo || *jabo
|-
! man/husband
| *ami[j]e || *ami[j]e || amie || *ami[j]e
|-
! woman/wife
| *ɾema || *ɾema || lema || 
|-
! sun
| *me[i]daʔa || *me[i]daʔa || meda || *me[i]daʔa
|-
! moon
| *ejoʔa || *ejoʔo || e-io || *ejoʔa
|-
! water/river
| *koɾu || *koɾu || oru ≈ koro- || *ʔoɾu
|-
! fire
| *ita || *ita || ita || *iha
|-
! stone
| *waʔiga ||  || waiga || *waʔiga
|-
! path
| *ida || *ida || ida || 
|-
! name
| *ɾoka || *ɾoka ||  || *ɾoʔa
|-
! eat/drink
| *iɾi- || *iɾi- ||  || *iɾi-
|-
! one
| *jokohi || *jokoi || jokio || *joʔohi
|-
! two
| *[ɾ/j]ema || *[ɾ]ema || lema || *jema
|}

Ross (2014)
The following basic vocabulary words of Proto-Manubaran and lower-level reconstructions by Malcolm Ross (2014) are from the Trans-New Guinea database:

{| class="wikitable sortable"
! gloss !! Proto-Manubaran !! Proto-Doromu !! Proto-Maria
|-
! head
| *ada || *ada || *ada
|-
! hair
| *weʔia || *ue-ta || *ueʔa
|-
! ear
| *ane-ma || *ane-ma || *ane-ma
|-
! eye
| *ne(u) || *ne(-) || *ne-
|-
! nose
| *uru-ma || *uru-ma || *uru-ma
|-
! tooth
| *gade || *gade || *gade
|-
! tongue
| *afie || *afie || *ahie
|-
! leg
| *[n,y]u-ka || *yu-ka || *nu-ʔa; *one-ʔa
|-
! louse
| *gue || *gue || *gue
|-
! dog
| *auna || *auna || *auna
|-
! pig
| *Dona || *dona || *tona
|-
! bird
| *erena || *erena || *erena
|-
! egg
| *une-ma || *une-ma || *une-ma
|-
! blood
|  || *tava || *tae(k,ʔ)a
|-
! bone
| *nena || *nena || *nena
|-
! skin
| *roʔ(o,a) || *ro(a) || *roʔ(o,a)
|-
! tree
| *yabo || *yabo || *yabo
|-
! man
| *amie || *amie || *amie
|-
! woman
|  || *rema || *oue
|-
! sky
| *gure || *gure || *gure
|-
! sun
| *maida(ka) || *meida(ka) || *maidaʔa
|-
! moon
| *e(y)oʔa; *mohe- (?) ||  || *eoʔa
|-
! water
| *koru || *koru || *ʔoru
|-
! fire
| *ita || *ita || *ita
|-
! stone
|  || *fore || *vaʔiga
|-
! name
| *roka || *roka || *roʔa-ba
|-
! eat
| *iri- || *iri || *iri-
|-
! one
| *yokohi || *yokoima || *yoʔohi
|-
! two
| *(ye)(ka)ma[nu] || *re-manu || *ye-ma
|}

Evolution
Maria reflexes of proto-Trans-New Guinea (pTNG) etyma are:

ama ‘mother’ < *am(a,i)
baba(e) ‘father’ < *mbapa
kuyau ‘cassowary’ < *ku(y)a
ita(isa) ‘tree’ < *inda

References

Further reading
Ross, Malcolm. 2014. Proto-Manubaran. TransNewGuinea.org.
Ross, Malcolm. 2014. Proto-Maria. TransNewGuinea.org.
Ross, Malcolm. 2014. Proto-Doromu. TransNewGuinea.org.

External links 
 Timothy Usher, New Guinea World, Owen Stanley Range
 (ibid.) Proto–Mount Brown

 
Owen Stanley Range languages
Languages of Central Province (Papua New Guinea)